Amjad Khan (12 November 1940 — 27 July 1992) was an Indian actor and film director. He worked in over 132 films in a career spanning nearly twenty years. He was the son of the actor Jayant. He gained popularity for villainous roles in mostly Hindi films, the most famous being Gabbar Singh in the 1975 classic Sholay and of Dilawar in Muqaddar Ka Sikandar (1978).

Early life
Amjad Khan was born in Bombay City, Bombay Presidency, British India on 12 November 1940 into a Sunni Muslim family of Pashtun descent to actor Jayant; who was originally from Peshawar, North-West Frontier Province.

His younger brother was actor Imtiaz Khan. Amjad Khan was educated at St. Andrew's High School in Bandra.

He attended R. D. National College where he held the position of general secretary, the highest elected student body representative. During his college and school days, he worked as a theater artist and performed in his college with his brother.

Career

Before Amjad Khan came to films, he was a theatre actor. His first role was as a child actor at the age of 11 in the film Nazneen in 1951. His next role was at the age of 17 in the film Ab Dilli Dur Nahin (1957). He assisted K. Asif in the film Love And God in the late 1960s and had a brief appearance in the film. The film was left incomplete after Asif's death in 1971, and it was finally released in 1986. In 1973, he appeared in Hindustan Ki Kasam in a small role.

In 1975, he was offered the role of dacoit Gabbar Singh for the film Sholay by Salim Khan, who was one of its writers. In preparation for the role, Amjad read Abhishapth Chambal, a book on Chambal dacoits written by Taroon Kumar Bhaduri (actress Jaya Bhaduri's father). Amjad shot to stardom with the movie. His mannerisms and dialogues have become an integral part of the Bollywood lexicon and spawned numerous parodies and spoofs [Specially "Soja Nahi to Gabbar Ajayega"]. Sholay went on to become a blockbuster. Although it boasted an ensemble cast of superstars including Dharmendra, Amitabh Bachchan and Sanjeev Kumar, who was nominated that year for the Filmfare award for Best Actor category, Amjad stole the show with his unorthodox and eerie dialogue delivery. Even to this day people fondly remember his dialogues and mannerisms. He later appeared in advertisements as Gabbar Singh endorsing Britannia Glucose Biscuits (popularly known as Gabbar Ki Asli Pasand), the first incidence of a villain being used to sell a popular product.

After the success of Sholay, Khan continued to play negative roles in many subsequent Hindi films in the 1970s, 1980s and early 1990s – superseding, in terms of popularity and demand, the earlier Indian actor, Ajit. He often acted as villain opposite Amitabh Bachchan as the hero. His role in Inkaar was also presented in terrifying manner. He made his presence felt in Des Pardes, Nastik, Satte Pe Satta, Chambal Ki Kasam, Ganga Ki Saugandh, Hum Kisise Kum Nahin and Naseeb.

Khan was also acclaimed for playing many unconventional roles. In the critically acclaimed film Shatranj Ke Khiladi (1977) (based on the novel of the same title), by Munshi Premchand and directed by Satyajit Ray, Khan played the helpless and deluded monarch Wajid Ali Shah, whose kingdom, Avadh, is being targeted by British colonialists from the British East India Company. It is the only movie in which he dubbed a song. In 1979, he portrayed Emperor Akbar in the film Meera. He played many positive roles such as in Yaarana (1981) and Laawaris (1981) as Amitabh's friend and father respectively, Rocky (1981) and Commander (1981). In the art film Utsav (1984), he portrayed Vatsayana, the author of the Kama Sutra. In 1988, he appeared in the Merchant Ivory English language film The Perfect Murder as an underworld don. He excelled at playing comical characters in films such as Qurbani (1980), Love Story and Chameli Ki Shaadi (1986). In 1991, he reprised his role as Gabbar Singh in Ramgarh Ke Sholay, a parody of the legendary film which included look-alikes of Dev Anand and Amitabh Bachchan.

He ventured into directing for a brief period in the 1980s, directing and starring in Chor Police (1983), which did not do well, and Ameer Aadmi Gareeb Aadmi (1985) which was a blockbuster at the box office.

Amjad was the president of the Actors Guild Association. He was respected in the film industry, and would intervene and negotiate disputes between actors and directors/producers. One such dispute occurred when Meenakshi Seshadri was forced to drop out of Damini (1993) by Raj Kumar Santoshi because she rejected his proposal. Amjad Khan sorted out the matter and made Raj Santoshi take back his harsh decision.

Personal life and death
In 1972, he married Shaila Khan and in the following year, she gave birth to their first child, Shadaab Khan. He also had a daughter, Ahlam Khan, and another son, Seemaab Khan. Ahlam married popular theatre actor Zafar Karachiwala in 2011.

In 1976, Amjad Khan met with a serious accident on the Mumbai-Goa highway which left him with broken ribs and a punctured lung. He was going to participate in the shooting of the film The Great Gambler, starring Amitabh Bachchan.

In July 1992, at a fairly young age of 51, he died of a heart attack.

Awards and nominations

Filmography

References

External links

 
 Amjad Khan biography

1940 births
1992 deaths
Indian male film actors
Film directors from Mumbai
Pashtun people
Indian people of Pashtun descent
Male actors in Hindi cinema
Hindi-language film directors
20th-century Indian male actors
Filmfare Awards winners
20th-century Indian film directors